The 2008 Formula 3 International Series was the 58th British Formula 3 International Series season. It began on 24 March 2008 at Oulton Park's Easter Monday meeting and ended on 12 October at Donington Park after 22 rounds in four countries. Jay Bridger sealed the National Class championship at the Bucharest meeting, with a third place in round nineteen. The overall championship went down to the final meeting as Oliver Turvey, Jaime Alguersuari, Brendon Hartley and Sergio Pérez all had a chance of winning the title, however it was Alguersuari that won the title, thanks to a double win at Donington.

Drivers and teams

Driver changes
Following the departure of Marko Asmer, who joined BMW Sauber as the team's test driver, Hitech Racing brought in 16-year-old British driver Max Chilton as the Estonian's replacement. Austrian Walter Grubmüller remains with the team.
Carlin Motorsport did not retain any of its drivers from the previous year, instead hiring Red Bull backed Brendon Hartley and Jaime Alguersuari. Brit Oliver Turvey, who has been an A1 Grand Prix rookie driver for A1 Team Great Britain, and Australian Sam Abay, also a race winner but at Formula BMW level, take the remaining seats in the Championship Class.
Unlike the previous year, Carlin also entered two cars in the lower national class level, Kristján Einar and Andrew Meyrick will drive them.
Räikkönen Robertson Racing retained Finn Atte Mustonen with Henry Arundel, Alistair Jackson and John Martin taking the remaining three seats.
Both Mansell brothers, Greg and Leo, left the team at the end of 2007. They were replaced by Marcus Ericsson, who won the final British Formula BMW Championship the previous year with Fortec, and fellow Formula BMW champion Philip Major. Sebastian Hohenthal retains his spot at the team.
T-Sport retain 2007 National Class winner Sergio Pérez who has been promoted to Championship class. Steven Guerrero and Salman Al-Khalifa, the latter having experience in the championship, take up T-Sport's vacant national class seats.
Ultimate Motorsport, the only team to use the Mygale chassis, retain experienced Esteban Guerrieri and Michael Devaney, both have a total of eight seasons of Formula Three between them. Angolan Ricardo Teixeira joins the team from Performance Racing.

Calendar

Standings

References

External links

 The official website of the British Formula 3 Championship

British Formula Three Championship seasons
Formula Three season
British
British Formula 3 Championship